The 1942–43 St. John's Redmen basketball team represented St. John's College of Brooklyn during the 1942–43 NCAA college basketball season. The team was coached by Joseph Lapchick in his seventh year at the school. St. John's home games were played at DeGray Gymansium in Brooklyn and the old Madison Square Garden in Manhattan.

Roster

Schedule and results

|-
!colspan=9 style="background:#FF0000; color:#FFFFFF;"| Regular Season

|-
!colspan=9 style="background:#FF0000; color:#FFFFFF;"| NIT

|-
!colspan=9 style="background:#FF0000; color:#FFFFFF;"| Red Cross Benefit Game

References

St. John's Red Storm men's basketball seasons
St. John's
National Invitation Tournament championship seasons
St Johns
St Johns